Rich Gossweiler is a research scientist with Google whose area of expertise is in HCI, interaction design, front-end web development, and System architecture.

Education 
Gossweiler graduated from the College of William and Mary, majoring in Computer Science and minoring in mathematics. He received both his master's degree and Ph.D. from the University of Virginia, focusing on computer science and perceptual psychology in relation to 3D graphics and VR. He was Randy Pausch's first Ph.D. student.

Career
Gossweiler is currently researching new search models, user experiences and collaborative applications for Google. He has worked at Hewlett-Packard, IBM Almaden Research Center, Xerox PARC, SGI and NASA where he worked at NASA Ames participating in the Mars Exploration Rover (MER) mission.

References

External links
 

Google employees
Living people
Year of birth missing (living people)
Scientists at PARC (company)